The Leader of the Government in the South Australian Legislative Council, commonly known as Leader of the Council and also called Leader of Government Business or Manager of Government Business, is the chief representative of the government in the upper house of the Parliament of South Australia. The leader is also responsible for the management of government business in the chamber. The office is held by a member of the Cabinet of South Australia.

Being the representative of the government in the upper house, the Leader of the Government takes a major part in debates in parliament. In terms of managing and scheduling government business, the Leader of the Government is responsible including:
 the order in which government issues are to be dealt with
 tactical matters in reaction to impediments to such management
 negotiation with their opposition counterpart (the Manager of Opposition Business) about the order in which bills are to be debated, and
 time allotted for debate.

List of leaders of the government

See also
 Leader of Government Business in the House of Assembly (South Australia)
 Leader of Government Business (disambiguation)
 Cabinet of South Australia
 Government of South Australia

References

Parliament of South Australia